Sclerodoris tuberculata is a species of sea slug, a dorid nudibranch, shell-less marine opisthobranch gastropod mollusks in the family Discodorididae.

Distribution
This species was described from Prison Island, Zanzibar Harbour, Zanzibar, Tanzania. It is widely distributed in the Indo-Pacific Ocean.

References

External links
 

Discodorididae
Gastropods described in 1904